Gariberto da Besana (died 921) was an archbishop who led the archdiocese of Milan.

Life 
Gariberto was a relative of da Besana and his son seem to be his successor. Gariberto died on 5 July 921.

References 

Archbishops of Milan
921 deaths
Year of birth unknown